Giancarlo Camolese (born 25 February 1961 in Turin) is an Italian football (soccer) manager, TV sports caster, ex footballer, university lecturer at SUISM in Turin and instructor at the Coverciano Training Centre for players and technical staff.

Biography
Following his career as footballer he completed his studies and graduated from Turin University in physical education and sport with a final mark of 110/110 cum laude in 2002.

Career

Player
As midfielder, Camolese began his professional career in the Unione Sportiva San Mauro and then made his first-team debut with Torino in 1974. He played for Biellese, Reggina, Alessandria, Lazio, Padova, Vicenza, Taranto and for Saviglianese at the end of his career.
He played a total of 230 matches in Serie C, which is currently the Lega Pro, and 141 matches in Serie B for Lazio, Padova and Taranto, while he never made his debut in Serie A, having only played for Torino in the Coppa Italia. He rose to fame with Lazio starting from -9 in the 1986–87 season and was promoted into Serie A at the end of the 1987–88 football season.

Coach
He began his coaching career as Saviglianese’s youth coach which was the team in which he had terminated his career as footballer. He was hired by Torino as second coach of the first team managed by Mauro Sandreani and later by Lido Vieri.

In the following season he worked as vice coach for Graeme Souness and then Edy Reya.

In 1998, he took part in the "Supercorso di Coverciano" (super course for coaches) which he passed with flying colours. In 1999, he worked for Torino as coach for the Youth Under 20, which he took to the national football championship finals.

At the end of October 2000 he replaced Gigi Simoni when he was dismissed from the bench leading the team to gain the first position in Serie A . With the Granata team he made his debut in the Serie A  by winning the Intertoto qualification.

Although he had achieved the highest number of points the previous year, he was dismissed in October 2002.

In the 2003–04 season he replaced Franco Colomba as coach of the Serie A  Reggina team and led them to safety.

In 2005, he became coach of the Vicenza team (for which he had been captain from 1990 to 1991) and managed to save them on the last day and was reconfirmed as coach for the 2006–07 season. 
On 10 October 2007 he replaced Fernando Orsi as coach of the Livorno  team finishing last in the Serie A table. After a good recovery, he was dismissed after a difficult second round a few days before the end.

On 24 March 2009 he was back on the bench for Torino, where he took over from Walter Novellino, although he was not able to save the team from relegation which occurred on 31 May 2009 after being defeated 3–2 by Roma and despite having obtained 10 points in 9 matches this defeat cost him his reappointment for the following season.

After a long absence from the bench, due to family problems, on 15 October 2012 Camolese started coaching again and became the Manager of the Pro Vercelli team. He was dismissed on 3 January 2013 having only gained 8 points from 2 draws and 2 wins in 13 matches. On 20 October he replaces the outgoing M.Schallibaum in Chiasso FC (Swisse Challenge League ) with a contract valid until June 2016, reaching a comfortable salvation finishing in  seventh place, the best result of the Club over the last three years.

Outside of football

TV sports-caster
In 2002, he commented on various World Cup matches of the Korean and Japanese teams for RAI, while in 2007 he was a football pundit for Mediaset Premium.

Teaching activities
At present he is a University Lecturer at SUISM in Turin and Teaches at the FIGC National Technical Centre and Coach Education School in Coverciano.

Honours

Manager
Torino
Italian Serie B Championship (1): 2000–01

References

Italian footballers
S.S. Lazio players
Torino F.C. players
Reggina 1914 players
Calcio Padova players
L.R. Vicenza players
U.S. Alessandria Calcio 1912 players
Taranto F.C. 1927 players
Serie B players
Serie C players
Italian football managers
L.R. Vicenza managers
Reggina 1914 managers
Torino F.C. managers
U.S. Livorno 1915 managers
Serie A managers
Living people
1961 births
Footballers from Turin
Association football midfielders
F.C. Pro Vercelli 1892 managers
A.S.D. La Biellese players